The Plum Island Range Lights are a pair of range lights located on Plum Island in Door County, Wisconsin. They were part of the Plum Island United States Life-Saving Station.  Plum Island was transferred to the United States Fish and Wildlife Service in 2007 and became part of the Green Bay National Wildlife Refuge. The life-saving station was listed on the National Register of Historic Places in 2010. Plum Island is seasonally open to the public for day-time use.

History

Plum Island is an island at the western shore of Lake Michigan in the southern part of the town of Washington in Door County, Wisconsin, United States. Plum Island is physically located between the mainland of Door County and Washington Island. There have been hundreds of shipwrecks off the island's shores.

The front and rear range lights were part of the United States Life-Saving Station that was established on Plum Island in 1896. The Plum Island front range light was originally identical to the front range light of the Baileys Harbor Range Lights, but was replaced by a modern skeletal light in 1964. The rear range light is the original tower and was added to the National Register of Historic Places in 1984, as the Plum Island Range Rear Light, reference number #84003659. The front light is directional, aligned on 330.5° true. The rear light is omnidirectional and is powered by an LED light. The original 4th order Fresnel lens was removed from the tower in 2015 and is on display at the Death's Door Maritime Museum in Gills Rock, WI.

Nearby Pilot Island and Plum Island were two of four Wisconsin properties turned over by the U.S. Coast Guard to the United States Bureau of Land Management. Large expenses for toxic waste-site environmental remediation were an impediment to transfers and restoration of the Plum Island site. Both islands were finally transferred to the United States Fish and Wildlife Service in 2007 and became part of the Green Bay National Wildlife Refuge. Significant numbers of nesting colonial birds are found on the islands.

The lighthouse keeper's house and Coast Guard station were listed as being among Wisconsin's ten most endangered historic properties in April 2000. All of the maritime structures on Plum Island were listed on the National Register of Historic Places in 2010. The Friends of Plum and Pilot Islands, Inc. have partnered with the United States Fish and Wildlife Service to restore the life-saving station on Plum Island. They accomplished lead paint abatement and repainting of the historic boathouse in the summer of 2010.

Getting there

The United States Fish and Wildlife Service closed Plum Island to public access to "ensure necessary protection of ground nesting migratory birds." The island was opened to the public for seasonal day-time use in 2017. However, buildings on the island are not generally accessible The life-saving station can be seen at a distance from the Northport-Washington Island ferry.

References

Further reading
 Eckert, Jack A. Life on Pilot Island in 1955.
 Havighurst, Walter (1943) The Long Ships Passing: The Story of the Great Lakes, Macmillan Publishers.
 Oleszewski, Wes, Great Lakes Lighthouses, American and Canadian: A Comprehensive Directory/Guide to Great Lakes Lighthouses, (Gwinn, Michigan: Avery Color Studios, Inc., 1998) .
 Pepper, Terry, Seeing the Light, Plum Island Range lights.
Lighthouse Friends - Plum Island Range Lights
 Robb, David, Recollections of Plum Island at Seeing the Light.
 Sapulski, Wayne S., (2001) Lighthouses of Lake Michigan: Past and Present (Fowlerville: Wilderness Adventure Books) ; .
 Wright, Larry and Wright, Patricia, Great Lakes Lighthouses Encyclopedia (Erin: Boston Mills Press, 2006) .

External links

Friends of Plum and Pilot Islands
NPS Inventory of Historic Light Stations - Wisconsin
Plum Island Range Lights at Door County Maritime Museum
Cleanup Completed at Wisconsin's Plum Island

Lighthouses completed in 1897
Houses completed in 1897
Lighthouses in Door County, Wisconsin
Lighthouses on the National Register of Historic Places in Wisconsin
National Register of Historic Places in Door County, Wisconsin